Marit Kamps (born 4 March 2001) is a Dutch judoka.

She is the bronze medallist of the 2022 Judo Grand Prix Almada in the +78 kg category. She won one of the bronze medals in her event at the 2022 Judo Grand Slam Antalya held in Antalya, Turkey.

On 12 November 2022 she won a silver medal at the 2022 European Mixed Team Judo Championships as part of team Netherlands.

References

External links
 
 
 

2001 births
Living people
Dutch female judoka
21st-century Dutch women